60S ribosomal protein L13a is a protein that in humans is encoded by the RPL13A gene.

Ribosomes, the organelles that catalyze protein synthesis, consist of a small 40S subunit and a large 60S subunit. Together these subunits are composed of 4 RNA species and approximately 80 structurally distinct proteins. This gene encodes a ribosomal protein that is a component of the 60S subunit. The protein belongs to the L13P family of ribosomal proteins. It is located in the cytoplasm. Transcript variants utilizing alternative polyA signals have been observed. This gene is co-transcribed with the small nucleolar RNA genes U32, U33, U34, and U35, which are located in its second, fourth, fifth, and sixth introns, respectively. As is typical for genes encoding ribosomal proteins, there are multiple processed pseudogenes of this gene dispersed through the genome.

References

Further reading

Ribosomal proteins